Ethnographic museums conserve, display and contextualize items relevant to the field of ethnography, the systematic study of people and cultures. Such museums include:

List by country/region

Albania
 Ethnographic Museum of Kavajë,
 Gjirokastër Ethnographic Museum
 National Ethnographic Museum (Berat)
 Solomon Museum, Berat

Austria
 Museum der Völker, Schwaz,Tyrol 
 Weltmuseum Wien ,  Vienna

Argentina
 Juan B. Ambrosetti Museum of Ethnography

Azerbaijan
 Gala State Historical Ethnographic Reserve, Baku
 Historical-ethnographic museum of Khinalug village
 Museum of Archaeology and Ethnography, Baku
 National Museum of History of Azerbaijan, Baku
 Nizami Ganjavi Ganja State History-Ethnography Museum

Bulgaria
 Ethnographic and Archeological Museum, Elhovo

Brunei
 Malay Technology Museum

China
 China Ethnic Museum, Beijing

Croatia
 Ethnographic Museum, Zagreb, Croatia

Czech Republic
 Ethnographic Museum of the National Museum, Prague

Ethiopia

 Ethnological Museum, Addis Ababa

France
 Musée alsacien, Strasbourg
 Musée alsacien, Haguenau
 Museon Arlaten, Arles
 Musée Arménien de France, Paris
  (MAAOA), Marseille
 Calvet Museum, Avignon
 Château de Boulogne-sur-Mer
 Musée dauphinois
 Departmental Museum of archaeology Gilort (Jérôme) Carcopino, Corsica
 Georges Labit Museum
 Musée de l'Homme
 Musée des Jacobins, Auch
 Musée du Quai Branly – Jacques Chirac, Paris
 Municipal Museum (Saverne)

Germany
 Dresden Museum of Ethnology
 Ethnological Museum of Berlin
 German Emigration Center
 Hessenpark
 Karlsruhe Palace
 Landesmuseum Hannover
 Leipzig Museum of Ethnography
 Linden Museum
 Museum August Kestner
 Museum der Weltkulturen
 Museum Europäischer Kulturen
 Museum Godeffroy
 Museum am Rothenbaum
 Overseas Museum, Bremen
 Sammlung für Völkerkunde
 State Museum for Nature and Man

Georgia
 Ozurgeti History Museum, Ozurgeti
Tbilisi Open Air Museum of Ethnography, Tbilisi

Greece
 Museum of Cretan Ethnology
 Ethnographic Museum, Pyrsogianni
 Folklife and Ethnological Museum of Macedonia and Thrace
 Historical and Ethnographical Museum of the Cappadocian Greeks
 Municipal Ethnographic Museum of Ioannina

Hungary
 Ethnographic Museum (Budapest)

Indonesia
 Aceh Museum
 Balanga Museum
 Balaputradeva Museum
 Bengkulu Museum
 Benteng Heritage Museum
 Indonesia Museum, TMII, East Jakarta
 National Museum of Indonesia
 Lambung Mangkurat Museum
 Museum Negeri Pontianak

Italy
 Museo delle Genti d'Abruzzo
 Regole of Ampezzo Ethnographic Museum
 Sicilian Ethnographic Museum Giuseppe Pitrè

Japan
 National Museum of Ethnology, Suita

Libya
 Ethnographic Museum of Tripoli

Mexico 
 Museo Nacional de las Culturas
 Museo Amparo

Netherlands
 Museum Maluku
 Museon
 Museum of Contemporary Tibetan Art
 Nationaal Museum van Wereldculturen, which includes:
 National Museum of Ethnology, Leiden
 Tropenmuseum, Amsterdam
 Africa Museum, Berg en Dal
 Wereldmuseum

Poland
 Ethnographic Museum of Kraków
 National Museum of Ethnography, Warsaw
 Ethnographic Museum of Toruń

Portugal
 House of the County
 Museum of Lavra School
 National Museum of Ethnology (Portugal)

Romania
 ASTRA National Museum Complex
 Dimitrie Gusti National Village Museum, Bucharest
 Ethnographic Museum of Transylvania
 Mikó Castle
 Museum of Oltenia
 Museum of Popular Architecture of Gorj
 Național Museum of the Romanian Peasant, Bucharest
 Palace of Culture (Iași)
 Vergu-Mănăilă House

Russia
 Khokhlovka
 Kunstkamera, Saint Petersburg
 Lonin Museum of Veps Ethnography
 Russian Museum of Ethnography, Saint Petersburg
 Tomskaya Pisanitsa Museum
 Ulan-Ude Ethnographic Museum

Serbia
 Ethnographic Museum, Belgrade

Slovenia
 Kajžnk House
 Liznjek Farm
 Workers' Barracks

Spain
 Black Pottery Museum
 Ethnographic Museum of Dairy
 Ethnographic Museum of Grandas de Salime
 Museum of Cádiz
 Museum of Jewellery in the Vía de la Plata
 Pontevedra Museum
 Valencian Museum of Ethnology
 Zaragoza Museum

Sweden
 Museum of Ethnography

Switzerland
 Ethnographic Museum of the University of Zurich
 Musée d'ethnographie de Genève, Geneva
 Museum of Cultures (Basel)
 North American Native Museum, Zurich

Tahiti
 Musée de Tahiti et des Îles, Punaauia

Turkey
 Adana Ethnography Museum
 Akşehir Museum
 Amasra Museum
 Amasya Museum
 Elazığ Archaeology and Ethnography Museum
 Ethnography Museum of Ankara
 Ankara Vakıf Museum

Ukraine
 Museum of Folk Life (Mariupol)

United Kingdom
 Pitt Rivers Museum, Oxford, England
 Horniman Museum, London, England

United States
 Brigham Young University Museum of Peoples and Cultures
 Cheech Marin Center for Chicano Art, Culture & Industry, Riverside, California
 Fowler Museum at UCLA, California
 Haffenreffer Museum of Anthropology
 Oconaluftee Indian Village
 Peabody Museum of Archaeology and Ethnology, Cambridge
 Peabody Museum of Salem
 Phoebe A. Hearst Museum of Anthropology, California
 Second Face Museum of Cultural Masks

Vietnam
 Vietnam Museum of Ethnology, Hanoi

See also
 Museums#Ethnological and ethnographic
 Ethnography
 :Category:Ethnographic museums

References

Ethnographic